Klounovo is a rural locality (a village) in Kubenskoye Rural Settlement, Vologodsky District, Vologda Oblast, Russia. The population was 23 as of 2002.

Geography 
Klounovo is located 29 km northwest of Vologda (the district's administrative centre) by road. Olekhovo is the nearest  locality.

References 

Rural localities in Vologodsky District